The men's changquan three events combined competition (changquan, short weapon, long weapon) at the 1990 Asian Games in Beijing, China was held from 29 September to 4 October at the Haidian Gymnasium.

Schedule

Results 
Only the top-six placing scores have been preserved.

References 

Men's_changquan